The following lists events that happened during 1964 in Chile.

Incumbents
President of Chile: Jorge Alessandri (until 3 November), Eduardo Frei Montalva

Events

February
14-23 February - the fifth version of the Viña del Mar International Song Festival is held.
19 February - the andacollo tragedy occurs, in which 7 miners were buried alive in the flor de té copper mine. later they would be rescued with the help of relatives and miners in the area.

March
2 March - a power cut of 9 hours and 36 minutes affects the northern part of the country, between the cities of Iquique and Copiapó.

August
4 August - through decree 2244 of 1964 of the ministry of justice, Rugby in chile takes legal personality.

September
4 September – is carried out the Chilean presidential election, 1964, giving Eduardo Frei Montalva as the winner with 1,409,012 votes.

November
3 November - Eduardo Frei Montalva assumes as president of the country for the period from November 3, 1964 to November 3, 1970.

Births
2 March – Jaime Pizarro
12 March – Esteban Valenzuela
17 April – Luis Pérez Muñoz
24 May – Álvaro Rudolphy
14 November – Carlos Chandía
27 November – Rubén Martínez (footballer)
6 December – Jorge González (musician)

Deaths
date unknown – Guillermo Subiabre (b. 1903)
8 March – Enrique Molina Garmendia (b. 1871)
26 June – Eberardo Villalobos (b. 1908)

References 

 
Years of the 20th century in Chile
Chile